Sethu Bhaskara Matriculation Higher Secondary School is a in Ambattur, Tamil Nadu State, India. It was founded On 6 June 1988 by Sethu Bhaskaran.  Dr. Sethu Kumanan is the Manager.

Description 
 Sethu Bhaskara is divided into five academic sections: 

 Kindergarten
 Primary school
 Middle school
 High school
 Higher Secondary school

These sections are operated under independent heads who are accountable to the Correspondent and the Principal. School is co-educational. Admission is open to all students irrespective of caste, creed, religion or nationality.

Sethu Bhaskara has graduated over 23 classes of 10th standard students and 69 classes of 12th standard students.  It has 7,600 students and 350 staff members. Full scholarships are given to 250 students every year.

Program
Sethu Bhaskara teach English, Tamil and Hindi from UKG. The third language is taught up to 8th std.

Integrated Education for Visually Challenged Children has been launched in Sethu Bhaskara in English medium. Twenty-three visually impaired students get free education, transport, and uniform.

References

External links
 

Primary schools in Tamil Nadu
High schools and secondary schools in Chennai
1988 establishments in Tamil Nadu
Educational institutions established in 1988